Abd ol Razzaq or Abd or Razzaq may refer to:
 Abd ol Razzaq, East Azerbaijan
 Abd ol Razzaq, West Azerbaijan